Sorik is a village in the Arevut Municipality of the Aragatsotn Province of Armenia, mostly populated by Yazidis.

References 

Populated places in Aragatsotn Province
Yazidi populated places in Armenia